"More Drinkin' Than Fishin'" is a song recorded by Canadian country artists Jade Eagleson and Dean Brody. The song was written by Stuart Walker and Jenna Walker of The Reklaws with Gavin Slate and Travis Wood. It is the second single off Eagleson's second studio album Honkytonk Revival.

Background
Eagleson called Brody an "incredible mentor" to him, saying he was "grateful" to have Brody join him on the track. In return, Brody said he was "proud to be invited along for the ride" and looking forward to being able to sing the song live together. The two also participated in a "who is more country" competition over social media in support of the song, which included commentary from fellow Canadian country artists Brett Kissel, Jojo Mason, Tyler Joe Miller, the Reklaws, and Meghan Patrick.

Critical reception
Joshua Murray of The Reviews Are In stated that Eagleson and Brody's voices work well together, adding that they "sing with the same distinct sound and vibe we know”. Kerry Doole of FYI Music News called the song a "good ole boy anthem", saying it "has the feel of a seasonal hit". Top Country named the song their "Pick of the Week" for July 25, 2021, describing it as the "feel-good single of the summer/year". ET Canada described it as "the ultimate new country anthem".<ref name="ET">{{cite web|title=Dean Brody & Jade Eagleson On What They Learned About Each Other During 'More Drinkin' Than Fishin Video Shoot|url=https://etcanada.com/video/eef5355e-fadb-11eb-bb8a-0242ac110003/dean-brody-jade-eagleson-on-what-they-learned-about-each-other-during-more-drinkin-than-fishin-video-shoot/ |work=ET Canada|access-date=September 3, 2021}}</ref>

Accolades

Commercial performance
"More Drinkin' Than Fishin'" peaked at number one on the Billboard'' Canada Country chart for week of December 11, 2021, marking Eagleson's third number one and Brody's seventh number one. It also peaked at number 81 on the Canadian Hot 100 for the same week. The song has been certified Gold by Music Canada.

Music video
The official music video for "More Drinkin' Than Fishin'" was directed by Ben Knechtel and premiered on August 11, 2021.

Charts

Certifications

References

Songs about alcohol
Songs about fishers
2021 songs
2021 singles
Jade Eagleson songs
Dean Brody songs
Songs written by Gavin Slate 
Songs written by Jenna Walker
Songs written by Stuart Walker (singer)
Songs written by Travis Wood (songwriter)
Song recordings produced by Todd Clark
Male vocal duets